In category theory, the concept of catamorphism (from the Ancient Greek:  "downwards" and  "form, shape") denotes the unique homomorphism from an initial algebra into some other algebra.

In functional programming, catamorphisms provide generalizations of folds of lists to arbitrary algebraic data types, which can be described as initial algebras. 
The dual concept is that of anamorphism that generalize unfolds. A hylomorphism is the composition of an anamorphism followed by a catamorphism.

Definition 
Consider an initial -algebra  for some endofunctor  of some category into itself.

Terminology and history 
The open brackets used are known as banana brackets, after which catamorphisms are sometimes referred to as bananas, as mentioned in Erik Meijer et al. One of the first publications to introduce the notion of a catamorphism in the context of programming was the paper “Functional Programming with Bananas, Lenses, Envelopes and Barbed Wire”, by Erik Meijer et al., which was in the context of the Squiggol formalism.
The general categorical definition was given by Grant Malcolm.

Examples 
We give a series of examples, and then a more global approach to catamorphisms, in the Haskell programming language.

Iteration 
Iteration-step prescriptions lead to natural numbers as initial object.

Consider the functor fmaybe mapping a data type b to a data type fmaybe b, which contains a copy of each term from b as well as one additional term Nothing (in Haskell, this is what Maybe does). This can be encoded using one term and one function. So let an instance of a StepAlgebra also include a function from fmaybe b to b, which maps Nothing to a fixed term nil of b, and where the actions on the copied terms will be called next.

type StepAlgebra b = (b, b->b) -- the algebras, which we encode as pairs (nil, next)

data Nat = Zero | Succ Nat -- which is the initial algebra for the functor described above

foldSteps :: StepAlgebra b -> (Nat -> b) -- the catamorphisms map from Nat to b
foldSteps (nil, next) Zero       = nil
foldSteps (nil, next) (Succ nat) = next $ foldSteps (nil, next) nat

As a silly example, consider the algebra on strings encoded as ("go!", \s -> "wait.. " ++ s), for which Nothing is mapped to "go!" and otherwise "wait.. " is prepended. As (Succ . Succ . Succ . Succ $ Zero) denotes the number four in Nat, the following will evaluate to "wait.. wait.. wait.. wait.. go!": foldSteps ("go!", \s -> "wait.. " ++ s) (Succ . Succ . Succ . Succ $ Zero). We can easily change the code to a more useful operation, say repeated operation of an algebraic operation on numbers, just by changing the F-algebra (nil, next), which is passed to foldSteps

List fold 
For a fixed type a, consider the functor mapping types b to the product type of those two types. We moreover also add a term Nil to this resulting type. An f-algebra shall now map Nil to some special term nil of b or "merge" a pair (any other term of the constructed type) into a term of b. This merging of a pair can be encoded as a function of type a -> b -> b.

type ContainerAlgebra a b = (b, a -> b -> b) -- f-algebra encoded as (nil, merge)

data List a = Nil | Cons a (List a) -- which turns out to be the initial algebra

foldrList :: ContainerAlgebra a b -> (List a -> b) -- catamorphisms map from (List a) to b
foldrList (nil, merge) Nil         = nil
foldrList (nil, merge) (Cons x xs) = merge x $ foldrList (nil, merge) xs

As an example, consider the algebra on numbers types encoded as (3, \x-> \y-> x*y), for which the number from a acts on the number from b by plain multiplication. Then the following will evaluate to 3.000.000: foldrList (3, \x-> \y-> x*y) (Cons 10 $ Cons 100 $ Cons 1000 Nil)

Tree fold 
For a fixed type a, consider the functor mapping types b to a type that contains a copy of each term of a as well as all pairs of b's (terms of the product type of two instances of the type b). An algebra consists of a function to b, which either acts on an a term or two b terms. This merging of a pair can be encoded as two functions of type a -> b resp. b -> b -> b.

type TreeAlgebra a b = (a -> b, b -> b -> b) -- the "two cases" function is encoded as (f, g)
 
data Tree a = Leaf a | Branch (Tree a) (Tree a) -- which turns out to be the initial algebra
 
foldTree :: TreeAlgebra a b -> (Tree a -> b) -- catamorphisms map from (Tree a) to b
foldTree (f, g) (Leaf x)            = f x
foldTree (f, g) (Branch left right) = g (foldTree (f, g) left) (foldTree (f, g) right)

treeDepth :: TreeAlgebra a Integer -- an f-algebra to numbers, which works for any input type
treeDepth = (const 1, \i j -> 1 + max i j)
 
treeSum :: (Num a) => TreeAlgebra a a -- an f-algebra, which works  for any number type 
treeSum = (id, (+))

General case 
Deeper category theoretical studies of initial algebras reveal that the F-algebra obtained from applying the functor to its own initial algebra is isomorphic to it.

Strong type systems enable us to abstractly specify the initial algebra of a functor f as its fixed point a = f a. The recursively defined catamorphisms can now be coded in single line, where the case analysis (like in the different examples above) is encapsulated by the fmap. Since the domain of the latter are objects in the image of f, the evaluation of the catamorphisms jumps back and forth between a and f a.

type Algebra f a = f a -> a -- the generic f-algebras

newtype Fix f = Iso { invIso :: f (Fix f) } -- gives us the initial algebra for the functor f

cata :: Functor f => Algebra f a -> (Fix f -> a) -- catamorphism from Fix f to a
cata alg = alg . fmap (cata alg) . invIso -- note that invIso and alg map in opposite directions

Now again the first example, but now via passing the Maybe functor to Fix. Repeated application of the Maybe functor generates a chain of types, which, however, can be united by the isomorphism from the fixed point theorem. We introduce the term zero, which arises from Maybe's Nothing and identify a successor function with repeated application of the Just. This way the natural numbers arise.

type Nat = Fix Maybe
zero :: Nat
zero = Iso Nothing -- every 'Maybe a' has a term Nothing, and Iso maps it into a
successor :: Nat -> Nat
successor = Iso . Just -- Just maps a to 'Maybe a' and Iso maps back to a new term

pleaseWait :: Algebra Maybe String -- again the silly f-algebra example from above
pleaseWait (Just string) = "wait.. " ++ string
pleaseWait Nothing = "go!"

Again, the following will evaluate to "wait.. wait.. wait.. wait.. go!": cata pleaseWait (successor.successor.successor.successor $ zero)

And now again the tree example. For this we must provide the tree container data type so that we can set up the fmap (we didn't have to do it for the Maybe functor, as it's part of the standard prelude).

data Tcon a b = TconL a | TconR b b
instance Functor (Tcon a) where
    fmap f (TconL x)   = TconL x
    fmap f (TconR y z) = TconR (f y) (f z)

type Tree a = Fix (Tcon a) -- the initial algebra
end :: a -> Tree a
end = Iso . TconL
meet :: Tree a -> Tree a -> Tree a
meet l r = Iso $ TconR l r

treeDepth :: Algebra (Tcon a) Integer -- again, the treeDepth f-algebra example
treeDepth (TconL x)   = 1
treeDepth (TconR y z) = 1 + max y z

The following will evaluate to 4: cata treeDepth $ meet (end "X") (meet (meet (end "YXX") (end "YXY")) (end "YY"))

See also 
Morphism
 Morphisms of F-algebras
 From a coalgebra to a final coalgebra: Anamorphism
 An anamorphism followed by an catamorphism: Hylomorphism
 Extension of the idea of catamorphisms: Paramorphism
 Extension of the idea of anamorphisms: Apomorphism

References

Further reading

External links 
 Catamorphisms at HaskellWiki
 Catamorphisms by Edward Kmett
 Catamorphisms in F# (Part 1, 2, 3, 4, 5, 6, 7) by Brian McNamara
 Catamorphisms in Haskell

Category theory
Recursion schemes
Functional programming
Morphisms
Iteration in programming